Ian Middleton (26 October 1928 – 24 October 2007) was a New Zealand novelist, who made a particular mark with his books set in post-Second World War Japan. Born in New Plymouth, he was the younger brother of noted New Zealand short story writer O. E. Middleton.

Blind, he said this gave him a "special perspective but 'without limitation'", and has been attributed to the "strong metaphoric colour, sensual - often erotic - quality and lush verbal richness of his writing".

A full list of his publications can be seen at the University of Auckland's NZ Literature file  and more biographical information is at the New Zealand Book Council's website.

Main works 
 Pet Shop (Waiura: A. Taylor, 1979)
 Faces of Hachiko (Auckland: Inca Print, 1984)
 Sunflower: a Novel of Present Day Japan (Auckland: Benton Press, 1986)
 Mr Ponsonby (Auckland: Lyndon, 1989)
 Reiko (Wellington: Moana Press, 1990)
 Harvest (Ōkato: Puniho Art Press, 1995)
 I See a Voice (Auckland: Flamingo, 1997)

The 'Japanese trilogy' - Faces of Hachiko, Sunflower and Reiko - describes a personal and complex portrayal of post-war Japan. Pet Shop, a novel on his early upbringing in small-town New Zealand, wartime Auckland and his experiences on a Norwegian tanker, was described by New Zealand writer Kevin Ireland as "an absorbing picture of the repressions that passed for a moral code".

References

1928 births
New Zealand male novelists
2007 deaths
People from New Plymouth
20th-century New Zealand novelists
20th-century New Zealand male writers